PP-18 Rawalpindi-XII is a Constituency of Provincial Assembly of Punjab.

2008—2013: PP-13 (Rawalpindi-XIII)

2013—2018: PP-13 (Rawalpindi-XIII)
General elections were held on 11 May 2013. Muhammad Arif Abbasi won this seat with 33595 votes.

All candidates receiving over 1,000 votes are listed here.

2018—2023 PP-18 Rawalpindi-XIII
From 2018 PP-13 (Rawalpindi-XIII) Become PP-18 Rawalpindi-XIII With Some changes has follow The following Census Charges of Rawalpindi City (1) Charge No.11 (2) Charge No.12 (3) Charge No.13 (4) Charge No.14 and (5) Charge No.23 of Rawalpindi District.

General elections are scheduled to be held on 25 July 2018.

See also
 PP-17 Rawalpindi-XI
 PP-19 Rawalpindi-XIII

References

External links
 Election commission Pakistan's official website
 Awazoday.com check result
 Official Website of Government of Punjab

R